The Guinean franc (ISO 4217 code: GNF) is the currency of Guinea. It is subdivided into one hundred centimes, but no centime denominations were ever issued.

History

First Guinean franc
The first Guinean franc was introduced in 1959 to replace the CFA franc.  There were 1, 5, 10 and 25 francs coins (made of aluminium bronze) with banknotes (dated 1958) in 50, 100, 500, 1000, 5000 and 10,000 francs denominations. A second series of banknotes dated 1er MARS 1960 was issued on 1 March 1963, without the 10,000 francs. This series was printed without imprint by Thomas De La Rue, and includes more colors, enhanced embossing, and improved security features. A new issue of coins in 1962 was made of cupronickel.

In 1971, the franc was replaced by syli at a rate of 1 syli = 10 francs.

Second Guinean franc
The Guinean franc was reintroduced as Guinea's currency in 1985, at par with the syli. The coins came in denominations of 1, 5 and 10 francs made of brass clad steel, with brass 25 francs (1987) and cupronickel 50 francs (1994) added later. Banknotes were first issued in denominations of 25, 50, 100, 500, 1000 and 5000 francs. Guinean notes of this series are unique from those of other countries in that the date of issue features very prominently as part of the overall design on the lower left hand corner of each note.

A second series issued in 1998 dropped the 25 and 50 francs banknotes, since they had been replaced by coins. In 2006, the third issue were introduced in denomination of 500, 1000 and 5000 francs that are similar to previous issues, but the most notable change was the use of full printing of the notes and enhanced security features on each of the notes. Another change for this issue was the size of the 500 francs was reduced. On 11 June 2007, a 10,000 franc was issued.

In 2010, a commemorative series of 1000, 5000, and 10,000 francs banknotes celebrating the fiftieth anniversary of both the Guinean franc and the Banque Centrale de la République de Guinée (BCRG) was issued featuring a diamond-shaped logo of the event on the front side of each denomination inside of the watermark window to the right.

On July 9, 2012, the Central Bank of the Republic of Guinea issued a new 10,000 francs banknote which is similar to the original issue, but it has been revised. The banknote's main color was changed from green to red, and instead of a diamond-shaped patch placed on the letters "RG" (for Republique de Guinée), it is now replaced by a holographic patch and the holographic security strip now showing on the reverse side. On May 11, 2015, the Central Bank of the Republic of Guinea issued a 20,000 franc banknote. On January 21, 2018, the Central Bank of the Republic of Guinea issued a revised banknote of 20,000 francs, with a reduced size and advanced security features. On March 1, 2019, on the 59th anniversary of the introduction of its national currency, the Central Bank of the Republic of Guinea issued a revised banknote for 10,000 francs and issued a new banknote for 2,000 francs.

Currently, the smallest denomination in circulation is the 500 francs note due to diminished purchasing power.

Exchange rate 

, 1 Euro is equal to 10,417.46 Guinean Francs, which means that the highest valued banknote, of 20,000 Francs, has a value of less than 2 Euros.

See also
 Economy of Guinea

Historical:
 CFA franc
 Guinean syli

References

External links
Banque Populaire Marocaine Guineenne

Economy of Guinea
Currencies introduced in 1959